4th and Loud is an American reality television series that debuted August 12, 2014, on the AMC cable network.  The series chronicles Rock and Roll Hall of Famers Gene Simmons and Paul Stanley (of the rock band Kiss) as they establish their new Arena Football League franchise, the Los Angeles Kiss, and try to bring their vision to the sport.  The AMC network announced that it would not renew the series for a second season, as the network was planning to move away from reality shows to focus more on its scripted programming.

Cast
 Gene Simmons – Co-owner
 Paul Stanley – Co-owner
 Doc McGhee – Kiss manager
 Brett Bouchy – Co-owner
 Schuyler Hoversten – Team president
 Bob McMillen – Head coach
 Bruno Silva – Head Athletic Trainer
 Colt Brennan – Quarterback
 Scott Bailey – Director of player personnel
 J. J. Raterink – Quarterback
 Beau Bell – Linebacker
 B. J. Bell – Defensive linemen
 Russell Shaw – Assistant coach
 Grady Tucker, Jr. – Assistant coach
 Walt Housman – Defensive coordinator

Episodes

References

External links

2014 American television series debuts
2014 American television series endings
2010s American reality television series
AMC (TV channel) original programming
English-language television shows
American sports television series
Cultural depictions of Kiss (band)